The following is a list of foxhound packs in the United Kingdom, which are recognised by the Masters of Foxhounds Association. Fox hunting is prohibited in Great Britain by the Protection of Wild Mammals (Scotland) Act 2002 and the Hunting Act 2004 (England and Wales), but remains legal in Northern Ireland. Since the inception of the ban, most registered hunts in Great Britain have switched to trail hunting as a legal alternative.

England
Traditional-style fox hunting with hounds in England is prohibited, with some exemptions, under the Hunting Act 2004.

South West England
 Avon Vale Foxhounds
 Axe Vale Hunt
 Berkeley Hunt
 Blackmore and Sparkford Vale Hunt
 Cattistock Hunt
 Cotley Hunt
 Cotswold Hunt
 Cotswold Vale Farmers Foxhounds
 Croome and West Warwickshire Foxhounds
 Cury Hunt
 Dartmoor Hunt
 Duke of Beaufort's Hunt
 Dulverton Farmers Hunt (formerly the Dulverton East Foxhounds)
 Dulverton West Foxhounds
 East Cornwall Hunt
 East Devon Hunt
 Eggesford Foxhounds
 Exmoor Foxhounds
 Four Burrow Hunt
 Lamerton Hunt
 Ledbury Hunt
 Mendip Farmers Hunt
 Mid Devon Foxhounds
 North Cotswold Hunt
 Portman Hunt
 Royal Artillery Hunt
 Seavington Hunt
 Silverton Foxhounds
 South and West Wilts Hunt
 South Devon Hunt
 South Dorset Hunt
 South Tetcott Hunt
 Spooners and West Dartmoor Hunt
 Stevenstone Hunt
 Taunton Vale Foxhounds
 Tedworth Hunt
 Tetcott Hunt
 Tiverton Foxhounds
 Torrington Farmers Hunt
 Vale of White Horse Hunt
 West Somerset Foxhounds
 West Somerset Vale Hunt
 Western Hunt
 Wilton Hunt

South East England
 Ashford Valley Tickham Hunt
 Bicester with Whaddon Chase Hunt
 Chiddingfold, Leconfield and Cowdray Hunt
 Crawley and Horsham Hunt
 East Kent Foxhounds
 East Kent with West Street Hunt
 East Sussex and Romney Marsh Foxhounds
 Hampshire Hunt (HH)
 Heythrop Hunt
 Hursley Hambledon Hunt
 Isle of Wight Foxhounds
 Kimblewick Hunt
 New Forest Hounds
 North Cornwall Foxhounds
 Old Berkshire Hunt
 Old Surrey Burstow and West Kent Hunt
 Southdown and Eridge Hunt
 Surrey Union Hunt
 Vine and Craven Hunt

East of England
 Cambridgeshire Hunt with Enfield Chace
 East Essex Hunt
 Essex and Suffolk Hunt
 Essex Farmers and Union Hunt
 Essex Hunt
 Fitzwilliam (Milton) Hunt
 Puckeridge Hunt
 Suffolk Hunt
 Thurlow Hunt
 West Norfolk Foxhounds

West Midlands 
 Albrighton and Woodland Hunt
 Atherstone Hunt
 Clifton-on-Teme Hunt
 Ludlow Hunt
 Moorlands Hunt
 North Herefordshire Hunt
 North Ledbury Hunt
 North Shropshire Hunt
 North Staffordshire Hunt
 Radnor and West Hereford Hunt
 Sir Watkin Williams-Wynns Hunt (the Wynnstay)
 South Herefordshire Hunt
 South Shropshire Hunt
 United Pack
 Warwickshire Hunt
 Wheatland Hunt
 Worcestershire Hunt

East Midlands 
 Barlow Hunt
 Belvoir Hunt
 Blankney Hunt
 Brocklesby Foxhounds
 Burton Hunt
 Cottesmore Hunt
 Fernie Hunt
 Grafton Hunt
 Grove and Rufford Hunt
 Meynell and South Staffordshire Hunt
 Oakley Hunt
 Pytchley Hunt
 Quorn Hunt
 South Notts Hunt
 South Wold Hunt
 Woodland Pytchley Hunt

North West England 
 Bewcastle Hunt
 Blencathra Foxhounds
 Cheshire Forest Hunt
 Cheshire Hunt
 Coniston Foxhounds
 Cumberland Farmers Hunt
 Cumberland Foxhounds
 Eskdale and Ennerdale Foxhounds
 Lunesdale Foxhounds
 Melbeak Foxhounds
 North Lonsdale Foxhounds
 Pennine Foxhounds
 Ullswater Foxhounds

North East England 
 Border Hunt
 Braes of Derwent Hunt
 College Valley and North Northumberland Hunt
 Haydon Hunt
 Morpeth Hunt
 North Pennine Hunt
 North Tyne Hunt
 Percy Hunt
 South Durham Hunt
 Tynedale Hunt
 West Percy Hunt

Yorkshire and the Humber 
 Badsworth and Bramham Moor Foxhounds
 Bedale Hunt
 Bilsdale Hunt
 Cleveland Hunt
 Derwent Hunt
 Farndale Hunt
 Glaisdale Foxhounds
 Goathland and Glaisdale Hunt
 Goathland Foxhounds
 Holderness Hunt
 Hurworth Hunt
 Middleton Hunt
 Saltersgate Farmers Hunt
 Sinnington Hunt
 Staintondale Hunt
 Wensleydale Foxhounds
 West of Yore Hunt
 York and Ainsty North Hunt
 York and Ainsty South Hunt
 Zetland Hunt

Wales
Fox hunting with hounds in Wales is prohibited, with some exemptions, under the Hunting Act 2004.

 Aber Valley Foxhounds
 Banwen Miners Hunt
 Brecon and Talybont Hunt
 Caerphilly & District Hunt
 Carmarthenshire Hunt
 Curre and Llangibby Hunt
 Cwrt Y Cadno Farmers Foxhounds
 David Davies Hunt
 Dwyryd Hunt
 Eryri (cwn Hela Eryi) Foxhounds
 Flint and Denbigh Hunt
 Gelligaer Farmers Hunt

 Glamorgan Hunt
 Gogerddan Hunt
 Golden Valley Hunt
 Gwendraeth Valley Hunt
 Irfon and Towy Hunt
 Llandeilo Farmers Hunt
 Llangeinor Pentyrch Foxhounds
 Llanwnnen Farmers Hunt
 Llanwrthwl Hunt
 Monmouthshire Hunt
 Nantcol Valley Foxhounds

 Pembrokeshire Hunt
 Pentyrch Hunt Club
 Sennybridge Farmers Hunt
 Cresselly Hunt
 Tanatside Hunt
 Teme Valley Hunt
 Tivyside Hunt
 Towy & Cothi Hunt
 Tredegar Farmers Hunt
 Vale of Clettwr Hunt
 Ystrad Taf Fechan Hunt

Scotland
Traditional-style fox hunting in Scotland is prohibited under the Protection of Wild Mammals (Scotland) Act 2002.

 Berwickshire Foxhounds
 Bewcastle Foxhounds
 Duke of Buccleuch's Hunt
 Dumfriesshire and Stewartry Foxhounds

 Eglinton Hunt
 Fife Foxhounds
 Jed Forest Foxhounds
 Kincardineshire Foxhounds

 Lanarkshire and Renfreshire Foxhounds
 Lauderdale Foxhounds
 Liddesdale Foxhounds
 Strathappin Hunt

Northern Ireland
Northern Ireland is the only part of the UK where traditional fox hunting is legal.

 Dungannon Foxhounds
 East Down Hunt
 Iveagh Hunt
 Killutagh, Old Rock and Chichester Hunt
 North Down Hunt
 South Tyrone Hunt

See also
 Fox hunting
 Trail hunting
 Drag hunting
 Clean boot hunting
 Protection of Wild Mammals (Scotland) Act 2002
 Hunting Act 2004

Notes and references

Foxhound packs
List
Foxhound packs of the United Kingdom